During the Classical era and Hellenistic era of Classical Antiquity, many Hellenic city-states had adopted democratic forms of government, in which free (non-slave), native (non-foreigner) adult male citizens of the city took a major and direct part in the management of the affairs of state, such as declaring war, voting supplies, dispatching diplomatic missions and ratifying treaties. These activities were often handled by a form of direct democracy, based on a popular assembly. Others, of judicial and official nature, were often handled by large juries, drawn from the citizen body in a process known as sortition.

By far the most well-documented and studied example is the Athenian democracy in Athens. However, we have documented examples of at least fifty-two Greek city-states including  Corinth, Megara, and Syracuse that also had democratic regimes during part of their history. According to Ober (2015), the proportion of Greek city-states with democratic regimes gradually increased from the mid 6th century BC to the end of the 4th century BC, when perhaps half of the one-thousand Greek city-states in existence at the time had democratic regimes.

Federal democracy 
During the period from the 4th to the early 2nd centuries BC, the political center of gravity in Greece shifted from individual city-states to federal leagues, such as the Aetolian League and the Achaean League. These were confederations that jointly handled the foreign and military affairs for the member cities. Their internal structure was democratic with respect to the member cities, that is, each city within the league had a weight roughly proportional to its size and power. On the other hand, the cities themselves were largely represented in the leagues by their wealthy elites if they had an oligarchic form of government (another common form of government during the late Classical and Hellenistic periods) or by their Tyrant if they had a tyrannical form of government.

These federal leagues differed from earlier groupings of Greek city-states, like the Peloponnesian League or the Delian League, in that they were not dominated by a single city as the earlier leagues used to be dominated by Athens and Sparta.

References

Further reading
Eric W. Robinson, Ancient Greek Democracy: Readings and Sources, John Wiley and Sons Ltd, 2003.
Classical Greece
 Josiah Ober, "The Rise and Fall of Classical Greece", Princeton University Press, 2015.